Muziwakhe McVictor Mazibuko (born 16 May 1991), known professionally as Muzi, is a South African DJ, singer, songwriter, and record producer. Born and raised in Empangeni, KwaZulu-Natal, he rose to public prominence after releasing his second album, Afrovision (2018).

Early life 
Muziwakhe “Muzi” McVictor Mazibuko was born on 16 May 1991 in Ngwelezane, a township on the outskirts of Empangeni. Muzi is the youngest of five children in his family.

Studio albums

References 

1991 births
Living people
South African DJs
Zulu people